Yolande Donlan (June 2, 1920December 30, 2014) was an American-British actress who worked extensively in the United Kingdom.

Early life and career
The daughter of James Donlan, a character actor in Hollywood films of the 1930s, it is speculated by some that she had uncredited roles in films such as Pennies From Heaven (1936) and Love Finds Andy Hardy (1938), but this has not been confirmed.

Her early credited roles include Frenchy, the maid in the horror film The Devil Bat (1940), with Bela Lugosi, and other small roles often as similar French-accented maid characters. She played Carole Landis' maid in Turnabout (also 1940) and one of Red Skelton's concubines in DuBarry Was a Lady (1942).

Donlan was a success as Billie Dawn in a touring production of Born Yesterday by Garson Kanin. It was the start of bigger things for Donlan. Laurence Olivier flew to Boston to confirm the opinion of American reviewers and chose Donlan to star in his production of the play to be staged in London's West End. The production opened at the Garrick Theatre in January 1947 and was very well received. Donlan was initially denied a work permit to star in the lead in Peter Pan due to complaints from Equity, the actor's union, who felt that a British star should have the lead.

Later life and career
After her run in Peter Pan ended, Donlan remained in the United Kingdom and began accepting film work. After Traveller's Joy (1949), Donlan worked for the director Val Guest as the female lead in several films including Miss Pilgrim's Progress (1949) with Michael Rennie, The Body Said No! (1950), with Michael Rennie; Mister Drake's Duck (1951), with Douglas Fairbanks, Jr., and Penny Princess (1952) in the title role co-starring with Dirk Bogarde. In 1950 British exhibitors voted her the most promising female newcomer.

Donlan married Guest in 1954, after their previous marriages had been dissolved. In total, Donlan appeared in eight films directed by her husband. The remaining films are They Can't Hang Me (1955), Expresso Bongo (1959) with Laurence Harvey and Cliff Richard, Jigsaw (1962) with Jack Warner, 80,000 Suspects (1963) with Richard Johnson. A further stage success came in 1959 in Jack Popplewell's And Suddenly It's Spring opposite Margaret Lockwood. Other films she made, with other directors, include Tarzan and the Lost Safari (1957) and Seven Nights in Japan (1976), her last film role.

Writing and last years
Her autobiographical travelogue, Sand in My Mink (1955) is a humorous tale of holiday adventures taken across Europe with her husband.

Donlan's autobiography, Shake the Stars Down was published in 1976 (known as Third Time Lucky in the USA), which concentrates on her childhood years growing up in the household of her actor father James Donlan in the Hollywood of the 1930s. It also charts her early career as a dancer and actress.

Guest retired from directing in 1985 and the couple moved to the USA in the early 1990s, where they resided in Palm Springs until his death in 2006. In later years, Donlan lived in Belgravia, London.

In 2004, a Golden Palm Star on the Palm Springs Walk of Stars was dedicated to her and Guest. She died in London on December 30, 2014.

Selected filmography
 Turnabout (1940) - Marie
 Cross-Country Romance (1940) - Jennie - Diane's Maid (uncredited)
 The Devil Bat (1940) - Maxine 
 Dark Streets of Cairo (1940) - Maggie Malone, aka Margo Molina 
 Road Show (1941) - Nurse (uncredited)
 Under Age (1941) - Lily Fletcher 
 Life Begins for Andy Hardy (1941) - Drugstore Waitress (uncredited)
 Miss Pilgrim's Progress (1949) - Laramie Pilgrim
 Traveller's Joy (1949) - Lil Fowler
 The Body Said No! (1950) - Mikki Brent
 Mister Drake's Duck (1951) - Penny Drake
 Penny Princess (1952) - Lindy Smith
 They Can't Hang Me (1955) - Jill Wilson
 Tarzan and the Lost Safari (1957) - Gamage Dean
 Expresso Bongo (1959) - Dixie Collins
 Jigsaw (1962) - Jean Sherman
 80,000 Suspects (1963) - Ruth Preston
 The Adventurers (1970) - Mrs. Erickson
 Seven Nights in Japan (1976) - American Wife

Theatre credits
1942 'Dodie' in "Goodnight Ladies", Blackstone Theatre, Chicago.
1944 'Julie' in "School for Brides", Royale Theatre, New York.
1947 'Billie Dawn' in "Born Yesterday" by Garson Kanin, Garrick Theatre, London.
1948  "Rocket to the Moon" by Clifford Odets, St Martin's Theatre, London.
1948 'Lucrece' in "Cage me a Peacock" (with Lionel Blair) by Noel Langley, Strand Theatre, London.
1950 To Dorothy, a Son (with Richard Attenborough and Sheila Sim), Savoy Theatre, London.
1953 "Redheaded Blonde", Vaudeville Theatre, London.
1954 "It's Different for Men", Golders Green Hippodrome, London.
1957 "Olive Ogilvy", Aldwych Theatre, London.
1958 'Lizzie' in "The Rainmaker", Olympia Theatre, Dublin.
1959 "Suddenly it's Spring" (with Margaret Lockwood), Duke of Yorks, London.
1965 "Dear Wormwood" (with Donald Wolfit and Hywel Bennett), Golders Green Hippodrome, London.
1971 "Chorus of Murder", (with Irene Handl and Robert Cawdron) Edinburgh.
1972 "Cut-Throat" Theatre Royal, Windsor.

References

External links

 

1920 births
2014 deaths
American film actresses
20th-century American actresses
American stage actresses
American expatriates in England
Actresses from Jersey City, New Jersey
21st-century American women